E8400 may refer to:
 Nikon Coolpix 8400, a digital camera
 Intel Core 2 Duo E8400, a central processing unit